Sergey Markoch (Serghei Marcoci, born 13 January 1963) is a Moldovan, Soviet and later, Russian, former water polo player who competed in the 1988 Summer Olympics and in the 1992 Summer Olympics.

See also
 List of Olympic medalists in water polo (men)
 List of World Aquatics Championships medalists in water polo

References

External links
 

1963 births
Living people
Moldovan male water polo players
Russian male water polo players
Olympic water polo players of the Soviet Union
Olympic water polo players of the Unified Team
Water polo players at the 1988 Summer Olympics
Water polo players at the 1992 Summer Olympics
Olympic bronze medalists for the Soviet Union
Olympic bronze medalists for the Unified Team
Olympic medalists in water polo
Soviet male water polo players
Medalists at the 1992 Summer Olympics
Medalists at the 1988 Summer Olympics
Honoured Masters of Sport of the USSR